Nacogdoches is a small city in deep East Texas and the county seat of Nacogdoches County, Texas, United States. The 2020 U.S. census recorded the city's population at 32,147.  Stephen F. Austin State University is located in Nacogdoches and specializes in forestry and agriculture.

History

Early years

Local promotional literature from the Nacogdoches Convention and Visitors Bureau describes Nacogdoches as "The Oldest Town in Texas". Evidence of settlement at the same site dates back to 10,000 years ago. It is near or on the site of Nevantin, the primary village of the Nacogdoche tribe of Caddo Indians.

Nacogdoches remained a Caddo Indian settlement until the early 19th century. In 1716, Spain established a mission there, Misión Nuestra Señora de Guadalupe. That was the first European construction in the area. The "town" of Nacogdoches got started after the French had vacated the region (1760s, following the French and Indian War), and Spanish officials decided that maintaining the mission was too costly. In 1772, they ordered all settlers in the area to move to San Antonio. Some were eager to escape the wilderness, but others had to be forced from their homes by soldiers. It was one of the original European settlements in the region, populated by Adaeseños from Fort Los Adaes.

Colonel Antonio Gil Y'Barbo, a prominent Spanish trader, emerged as the leader of the settlers, and in the spring of 1779, he led a group back to Nacogdoches. Later that summer, Nacogdoches received designation from Spain as a pueblo, or town, thereby making it the first "town" in Texas. Y'Barbo, as lieutenant governor of the new town, established the rules and laws for local government. He laid out streets with the intersecting El Camino Real (now State Highway 21) and  La Calle del Norte/North Street (now Business U.S. Highway 59-F) as the central point. On the main thoroughfare, he built a stone house for use in his trading business. The house, or Old Stone Fort as it is known today, became a gateway from the United States to the Texas frontier.

1800s

The city has been under more flags than the state of Texas, claiming nine flags. In addition to the Six Flags of Texas, it also flew under the flags of the Magee-Gutierrez Republic, the Long Republic, and the Fredonian Rebellion. People from the United States began moving to settle in Nacogdoches in 1820 and Texas' first English-language newspaper was published there.
However, the first newspaper published (in the 1700s) was in Spanish. An edition of the newspaper (in Spanish) is preserved and shown at the local museum.

In 1832, the Battle of Nacogdoches brought many local settlers together, as they united in their stand to support a federalist form of government. Their successful venture drove the Mexican military from East Texas.

Thomas Jefferson Rusk was one of the most prominent early Nacogdoches Anglo settlers. A veteran of the Texas Revolution, hero of San Jacinto, he signed the Texas Declaration of Independence and was secretary of war during the Republic of Texas. He was president of the Texas Statehood Commission and served as one of the first two Texas U.S. Senators along with Sam Houston. He worked to establish Nacogdoches University, which operated from 1845 to 1895. The Old Nacogdoches University Building was added to the National Register of Historic Places in 1971. Rusk suffered from depression as a result of the untimely death of his wife and killed himself on July 29, 1857.

Sam Houston lived in Nacogdoches for four years prior to the Texas Revolution (1836) and opened a law office downtown.  He courted Anna Raguet, daughter of one of the leading citizens, but Anna rejected him after finding that he was not divorced from his first wife Eliza Allen of Tennessee.

William Goins (Goyens, Goings, Going), the son of a white mother and black father, operated a local inn, trucking service, and blacksmith works and maintained a plantation outside Nacogdoches on Goins Hill.  He was married to a white woman and owned slaves. He was appointed as an agent to trade with the Cherokees and was prominent in providing assistance to the Texas Army during the Revolution.

Adolphus Sterne was a merchant of German Jewish extraction who maintained the finest home in town. His frequent visitors included Sam Houston, Thomas Rusk, Chief Bowles and David Crockett, so his diary is one of the best sources for early Nacogdoches history.

Nacogdoches also contains one of the last surviving family-owned homestead plantations in East Texas, the August Tubbe Plantation, owned and operated by the same family which established it in 1859. August Tubbe was a German-born immigrant, who with his elderly mother, left Germany in 1858 and arrived in Nacogdoches by 1859. Their lives are recounted in several books, including a historical fiction novel by Gisela Laudi entitled "I am Justina Tubbe".  Tubbe plantation is historically significant in the formation of early life in East Texas, not only in its cotton and sugarcane, but also because it later played an important part in milled-lumber production. Tubbe Sawmill was actually the first water-, and then steam-powered, sawmill in Nacogdoches. During renovations of the Cason-Monk buildings in the early 21st century, boards stamped with Tubbe Mill logos made dating the building possible. The estate contains one of the largest privately-owned genealogical archives pertaining to the Tubbe family in existence, providing important insight into early settlers' life during the 19th century. The family has been featured in a number of German museums including the Expo2000 in Bremerhaven Germany. The estate and archives are privately owned and maintained by a descendant of its original founder, and are currently available for study through private appointment only. The Tubbe family is considered to be one of the "founding families" of Nacogdoches, making their mark in many ways spanning over 150 years. August Tubbe was responsible for not only his large 2,000-acre plantation, sawmill, and participation in Milam Masonic Lodge, but also is credited with bringing the now defunct Texas and New Orleans Railroad spur into town. Tubbe estate as a whole is now owned and managed by Thomas VonAugust Tubbe-Brown, the fifth-generation grandson of August Tubbe.

In 1859, the first oil well in Texas began operation here, but it was never so well known as Spindletop, drilled in 1901 near Beaumont. Lyne Taliaferro Barret began this operation, which was interrupted by the American Civil War. However, after the war, Barret returned to Oil Springs, an area about 13 miles east of Nacogdoches, to resume his project by acquiring another drilling contract in 1865. Barret struck oil on September 12, 1866, at a depth of 106 feet. The well-produced around 10 barrels of oil per day, but was recorded to produce a range of 8 to 40 barrels. In 1868, the price of oil dropped so low that Barret lost his financial backing, and was forced to resign from the project. The fields then lay dormant for another 20 years, until 1889, when various drilling companies had 40 wells on the site. The site was never very productive, only yielding 54 barrels in 1890. However, it remains the first and oldest oil well in Texas, with production being recorded into the 1950s.

1900s–present

In 1912, the Marx Brothers came to town to perform their singing act at the old Opera House (now the SFA Cole Art Center).  Their performance was interrupted by a man who came inside shouting, "Runaway mule!" Most of the audience left the building, and when they filed back in, Julius (later known as Groucho) began insulting them, saying "Nacogdoches is full of roaches!" and "The jackass is the flower of Tex-ass!" Instead of becoming angry, audience members laughed. Soon afterward, Julius and his brothers decided to try their hand at comedy instead of singing, at which they had barely managed to scrape together a living. A plaque commemorating the event is posted in downtown Nacogdoches. 

On January 4, 1946, a violent tornado devastated part of the city, killing ten people and injuring 200 others. Tornado expert Thomas P. Grazulis estimated the intensity of the tornado to have been F4 on the Fujita scale.

In the edition of March 8, 1950, of You Bet Your Life, Marx said, "I was once pinched in Nacogdoches for playing euchre on the front porch of a hotel. It happened to be on a Sunday. You're not allowed to play euchre in Nacogdoches on a Sunday.  As a matter of fact, the way I played it they shouldn't have allowed it on Saturday, either." Marx would often mention Nacogdoches in the show if any contestant came from Texas.

In 1997, singer Willie Nelson came to Nacogdoches to perform with his friend, Paul Buskirk, a mandolin player. During his stay, Nelson recorded a number of jazz songs at Encore Studios. In 2004, he released those recordings on an album called Nacogdoches.

On February 1, 2003, the Space Shuttle Columbia broke up during re-entry, depositing debris across Texas. Much of the debris landed in the Nacogdoches area, and much of the media coverage of the recovery efforts focused on Nacogdoches.

On September 24, 2005, Hurricane Rita struck Nacogdoches as a category-1 hurricane.  Nacogdoches experienced the same problems Houston was having because of the unprecedented number of people evacuating the Houston-Galveston area. The city's local shelters were already overwhelmed with evacuees who had come from New Orleans because of Hurricane Katrina. Long lines at gas stations and shortages of supplies, food, and fuel were widespread. Many Houstonians took the Eastex Freeway (U.S. Highway 59) (future Interstate 69) out of Houston to evacuate through East Texas. As a result of Hurricane Rita, U.S. Highway 59 has been designated as an evacuation route by TXDOT, with all of its lanes to be used for contraflow traffic. Nacogdoches was designated as the north-end terminus of the contraflow/evacuation route.

On September 13, 2008, Hurricane Ike struck Nacogdoches as a category-1 hurricane.

Nacogdoches hosts the Texas Blueberry Festival on the second Saturday in June. The community is one of the first Texas Certified Retirement Communities. The community celebrates a host of other events year round which can be found by going to visitnacogdoches.com

Once a Democratic stronghold, Nacogdoches has in recent years moved steadily toward the Republican Party, being represented in the United States Congress and the Texas State Legislature by Republicans. The city, in general, is very moderate with the co-existence of students of Stephen F. Austin with a liberal left-of-center persuasion and conservative right-of-center city residents.

Nacogdoches has been in the Texas Main Street Program since 1998. Nacogdoches' downtown was named the "Best Historic Venue" by Texas Meetings and Events magazine. Nacogdoches was nominated as one of the "Friendliest Towns in America" by Rand McNally and USA Today.

Nacogdoches is the headquarters of the Texas Wing of the Civil Air Patrol, the Air Force Auxiliary.

Geography

The city center is just north of the fork of two creeks, the LaNana and Banita.

Climate

Typically, the warmest month is August.
The typical coolest month is January.
The most precipitation usually occurs in May.

Demographics

According to the 2010 census, Nacogdoches had a population of 32,996. The racial and ethnic composition of the population was 51.2% White, 28.4% Black, 0.5% Native American, 1.8% Asian, 0.1% Pacific Islander, 0.1% reporting some other race, 2.3% reporting two or more races, and 16.8% Hispanic or Latino American.

At the census of 2000, 29,914 people, 11,220 households, and 5,935 families resided in the city. The population density was 1,185.9 people per square mile (457.8/km). The 12,329 housing units averaged 488.7 per square mile (188.7/km). The racial makeup of the city was 65.98% White, 25.06% African American, 1.13% Asian, 0.34% Native American, 0.11% Pacific Islander, 5.84% from other races, and 1.55% from two or more races. Hispanics or Latinos of any race were 10.82% of the population.

At the 2019 American Community Survey's five year estimates program, the racial and ethnic makeup of the city was 51.0% non-Hispanic white, 26.1% Black or African American, 0.1% Native American, 2.3% Asian, 1.6% two or more races, and 18.8% Hispanic or Latino American of any race. A year later, the 2020 census tabulated a majority non-Hispanic white population.

Of the 11,963 households in 2019, the average family size was 3.06 and 53.2% of the total population were married. In contrast to several growing cities in Texas, the median age was 24.4 in 2019.

The median household income for the city was $54,444 from 2014 to 2019, against the statewide median household income of $64,034. Married-couple families had a median household income of $78,843 while non-family households had a median income of $22,076. Among the population, 31% of the city lived at or below the poverty line; 34% of the population aged 18 to 64 lived at or below the poverty line, and 33.9% of the population under age 18 lived at or below the poverty line.

There was a median gross rent of $771 in contrast with the statewide median gross rent of $1,091 at the 2019 American Community Survey. Among the population, there was a 37.5% homeownership rate and 2,068 vacant housing units in the city limits as of the 2020 census.

Economy

The economy of Nacogdoches is heavily dependent on Stephen F. Austin State University. Like many college towns in the United States, Nacogdoches businesses heavily depend on university students as customers and regularly employ them. Other large sectors of the local economy are healthcare, manufacturing, agriculture, and lumber.

According to the city's 2017 Comprehensive Annual Financial Report, the top employers in the city were:

Government

The management and coordination of city services is overseen by a mayor, city manager and other administrative and operational roles.

Local government

County government

According to the county's most recent Comprehensive Annual Financial Report Fund Financial Statements, the county's various funds had $23.5 million in revenues, $23.6 million in expenditures, $57 million in total assets, and $15 million in total liabilities. The county had $7.3 million in investments.

State government

Nacogdoches is represented in the Texas Senate by Republican Robert Nichols, District 3, and in the Texas House of Representatives by Republican Travis Clardy, District 11.

The Texas Department of Criminal Justice operates the Nacogdoches District Parole Office in Nacogdoches.

Federal government

At the federal level, the two U.S. Senators from Texas are Republicans John Cornyn and Ted Cruz; Nacogdoches is part of Texas's 1st congressional district, which is currently represented by Republican Louie Gohmert.

Education

The city of Nacogdoches is primarily served by the Nacogdoches Independent School District. Small portions of the city are also zoned into the Woden ISD. School districts serving surrounding areas include Central Heights, Douglass, Garrison, Martinsville, Chireno and Cushing districts.

Nacogdoches is home to Stephen F. Austin State University, which is a state institution of about 13,000 students. Stephen F. Austin is also home to the East Texas Historical Association.  Angelina College operates a branch campus in Nacogdoches.

The Texas Legislature designated Nacogdoches County as being in the boundary of Angelina College's district.

Newspaper
The Daily Sentinel, founded in 1899, is published and distributed in the Nacogdoches area.

Points of interest

 Mast Arboretum
 Millard's Crossing Historic Village
 Old Stone Fort Museum

Notable people

 Oscar P. Austin, Medal of Honor recipient
 Roy Blake, Sr., Texas legislator and businessman, and former Nacogdoches City Councillor
 Antonio Gil Y'Barbo, frontier trader
 Sam Houston, president of the Republic of Texas
 Kay Bailey Hutchison, U.S. Senator
 Joseph W. Kennedy, co-discoverer of plutonium
 Joe R. Lansdale, award-winning author and martial-arts expert
 Leslie Ludy, author and public speaker
 Thomas Jefferson Rusk, military leader and U.S. Senator

Athletes

 Grady Allen, former football player for the Atlanta Falcons
 Brandon Belt, baseball player
 Bucky Brandon, baseball player
 Domingo Bryant, football player
 Larry Centers, football player
 Clint Dempsey, former soccer player
 Philip Humber, baseball player
 Damion James, basketball player
 Mark Moseley, football player
 Bum Phillips, football coach
 Greg Roberts, former football player
 Jeremiah Trotter, football player
 Thomas Walkup, basketball player

Entertainers

Tony Frank, actor
Don Henley, musician
Kasey Lansdale, actress and musician
Bob Luman, musician
Brad Maule, actor
Ron Raines, actor
Alana Stewart, actress, talk show host

See also

List of museums in East Texas

Notes

References

External links 

 

 
Cities in Nacogdoches County, Texas
County seats in Texas
Cities in Texas